Lee Kellett is a former professional rugby league footballer who played for Featherstone Rovers during the 1986–87 season.

References

Living people
English rugby league players
Featherstone Rovers players
Place of birth missing (living people)
Rugby league wingers
Year of birth missing (living people)